The name Maria has been used for seven tropical cyclones worldwide, three in the Atlantic Ocean and four in the Western Pacific Ocean.

In the Atlantic Ocean:
 Hurricane Maria (2005), a Category 3 hurricane that did not affect any land area as a tropical cyclone.
 Hurricane Maria (2011), a Category 1 hurricane that formed in the eastern Atlantic, made landfall on Newfoundland, causing minor damage.
 Hurricane Maria (2017), an extremely powerful hurricane that made landfall in the island of Dominica at Category 5 intensity, and later brushed through St. Croix, U.S. Virgin Islands before making landfall in Puerto Rico as a high-end Category 4 hurricane where devastation and a humanitarian crisis occurred.

The name Maria was retired after the 2017 season because of the extensive damage and loss of life caused by the storm and was replaced with Margot for the 2023 season.

In the Western Pacific Ocean:
 Tropical Storm Maria (2000) (T0013, 21W) – a severe tropical storm that made a landfall in southern China
 Typhoon Maria (2006) (T0607, 09W) – tracked just south and east of Japan
 Severe Tropical Storm Maria (2012) (T1222, 23W)
 Typhoon Maria (2018) (T1808, 10W, Gardo) – a Category 5 super typhoon which weakened before making landfall in East China

Atlantic hurricane set index articles
Pacific typhoon set index articles